Selwin is an unincorporated community in Chowan and Gates Counties in the U.S. state of North Carolina.  Its elevation is 33 feet (10 m).

References

Unincorporated communities in Chowan County, North Carolina
Unincorporated communities in Gates County, North Carolina
Unincorporated communities in North Carolina